Golek pri Vinici is a settlement north of Vinica in the Municipality of Črnomelj in the White Carniola area of southeastern Slovenia. The area is part of the traditional region of Lower Carniola and is now included in the Southeast Slovenia Statistical Region.

References

External links
Golek pri Vinici on Geopedia

Populated places in the Municipality of Črnomelj